Les Dalton courent toujours is a Lucky Luke adventure written by Goscinny and illustrated by Morris. It is the 23rd book in the series and it was originally published in French in 1964 and by Cinebook in English in 2012 as The Daltons Always On The Run.

Synopsis 
The new President of the United States decrees a general amnesty. All prisoners are released, including the Daltons. They settle in a nearby town, Awful Gulch, and rent a space next to the bank, so they can tunnel to this establishment and steal the money. But Lucky Luke quickly moves the bank and instals the sheriff's office there instead.

Joe Dalton then changes his mind and attacks the stagecoach after Averell knocks out Lucky Luke. They then spend a little time in Pocopoco Pueblo then, after their crimes have been known in this city, try to cross the desert. This is where Lucky Luke catches them and brings them back to the penitentiary.

Characters 

 The Daltons
 Averell: The tallest and stupidest, always hungry, a born blunderer.
 Jack: Smaller than Averell, but larger than William.
 William: Smaller than Jack, but larger than Joe.
 Joe: The smallest, the most nasty, "stupid, (...) selfish, conceited, cruel and greedy", he has an inexhaustible hatred for Lucky Luke.

External links
Lucky Luke official site album index 
Goscinny website on Lucky Luke 

Comics by Morris (cartoonist)
Lucky Luke albums
1964 graphic novels
Works by René Goscinny